The American Journal of Health Behavior is a peer-reviewed academic journal published by PNG Publications and Scientific Research Limited. It covers the study of individual and social efforts on health behaviors. The editor-in-chief is Elbert D. Glover (University of Maryland School of Public Health).

Abstracting and indexing
The journal is abstracted and indexed in the Social Sciences Citation Index and Scopus. According to the Journal Citation Reports, the journal has a 2021 impact factor of 2.006.

History
In 1977, Slack Incorporated (Thorofare, New Jersey) first published Health Values. In 1989, Elbert D. Glover acquired Health Values from Slack. Using his wife’s initials, he named the new publisher PNG Publications. Seven years later, in 1996, Glover renamed the journal to its current title. He was the owner, editor-in-chief and publisher from 1989 till 2021 when he sold the journal to JCFCorp (Singapore). As part of their enterprise, the new publisher choose to retain the original publisher name, but slightly changed to "PNG Publications and Scientific Research Limited" (London). As part of the transition, Glover was retained as editor-in-chief in name only and has no influence or input into any aspect of the journal.

Controversy 

In exchange for a $51,000 fee, the 2021 May/June issue of the journal was made available open access and dedicated to studies funded by e-cigarette company Juul that provided results favoring Juul. All of the studies' co-authors were found to be current or former Juul employees or to be affiliated to or under contract with Juul.

References

External links

Sociology journals
English-language journals
Public health journals
Social psychology journals
Publications established in 1977